The Rambla del Poyo is a 41 km Rambla in the Province of Valencia, Spain.

It lies between the Turia and Júcar rivers, with its source in the mountains of the Parque Natural del Turia, and the mouth at the Albufera de Valencia by the Mediterranean Sea.

References

Rivers of Spain
Rivers of the Valencian Community